Ross Bolleter (born 1946, Subiaco, Western Australia) is a composer and musician whose work is focused on ruined pianos. His recordings are available on Emanem (London), Pogus (New York), New Albion (San Francisco) and Tall Poppies (Sydney), as well as on his WARPS (World Association for Ruined Piano Studies) label.
https://bolleter.wixsite.com/warpsmusic

Career

Music
Bolleter studied the music theory as well as its history and composition at the University of Western Australia between 1964 and 1967. This fired his interest in the music of composers such as Webern, Boulez and Cage. After playing the piano for six years at the Parmelia Hilton, he explored non-conventional timbral and rhythmic possibilities of the prepared piano and released a cassette, The Temple of Joyous Bones, which featured the piano. Bolleter found inspiration in the eighties playing and recording improvised music with flautist Tos Mahoney and double bassist, Ryszard Ratajczak.

Over the past thirty years Bolleter has explored the timbral possibilities of ruined pianos, as quoted: old pianos that have been exposed to the elements of time and weather thus acquiring novel and unexpected musical possibilities. A piano is ruined (rather than neglected or devastated) when it has been abandoned to all weathers and has become a decaying box of unpredictable dongs, tonks and dedoomps. The notes that do not work are at least as interesting as those that do.

Ross Bolleter has five ruined pianos in his kitchen including the original ruined piano from Nallan Sheep Station, near Cue, 800 km north east of Perth, Western Australia. At Kim Hack's and Penny Mossops's olive farm, Wambyn, near York, Western Australia, Kim Hack and Bolleter developed the Ruined Piano Sanctuary, where some forty pianos are ruining in their own ways, and at their own pace, variously under trees, in dams, and on roofs. Bolleter's CD Frontier Piano, which represents the best of his work from 2007–2014, is almost entirely devoted to recordings of these dying pianos. Each piano in decay is a long-running composition. Death comes to every piano, and dying, each sings a different kind of song.

In 1989 Bolleter set up the Synchronicity Project where he devised a series of intuitive pieces where musicians improvised simultaneously but in different centres in Australia and across the world. In several instances these pieces were set up to cast a net for synchronistic events, especially musical synchronicities. The Synchronicity Project produced a series of radiophonic works. The first of these works was Simulplay 1 (September 1989) had Jim Denley playing flute to a live audience at the B rucknerhaus in the Ars Electronica in Linz, Austria – with Bolleter playing piano and accordion, together with Carol Henning playing plastic trombone, in the ABC radio studios, Perth. The second work, That Time/Simulplay 2 – an intuitive piece for two musicians on opposite sides of a continent, playing at precisely the same time but unable to hear each other, while a radio audience hears both of them – involved Ryszard Ratajczak playing double bass in Studio 210 of ABC FM Sydney with Bolleter playing both pianos in separate recordings in ABC's Studio 621, Perth. That Time/Simulplay 2 was released on the Pogus label, New York, as part of the album Crow Country in 2000. <Ross Bolleter and Rowan Hammond:“Improvising with synchronistic experiences” in NMA 9, Melbourne, 1991>

Another radiophonic piece Pocket Sky: a worldwide link up between Jim Denley (Radio ORF Vienna), Stevie Wishart (BBC London), David Moss (SFR Berlin), Jon Rose (ABC Sydney), Simone de Haan (ABC Melbourne), and Bolleter (ABC Perth), took place on 21 October 1991. It was released as the CD Pocket Sky (2004) (WARPS W08).

Bolleter's 1996 piece Left Hand of the Universe CD (WARPS W02) linked up Michal Murin and other Slovak and Czech musicians in Bratislava, and Stephen Scott and various musicians at Colorado College, without recourse to radio. All the musicians were playing ruined instruments, or were in the process of ruining them. Left Hand of the Universe was released on CD in 1997 as WARPS W02.

Bolleter's output also includes three CDs of café music: Paradise Café, Café Sophia and Café Antoinette which feature him playing the accordion, his film music, and his songs. Bolleter's songs, sung by Anthony Cormican, are also featured on their CD Songs from the Third Watch. This CD includes Bolleter's setting of Kenneth Slessor's 1937 poem Five Bells and Cormican's setting of Billy Strayhorn's Lush Life.

Bolleter has released more than thirty CDs, primarily of ruined piano compositions and improvisations. His CD Crow Country, released on the Pogus label as Pogus 7 6034-21021-2 (New York, 2000.), was nominated as one of the 10 best albums of 1999 by Cadence Magazine (New York) and constitutes the best of his work from 1988 to 1999. Secret Sandhills and Satellites, released on the Emanem label, London, UK (2006), was voted best CD of September 2006 by Blow Up magazine (Italy), and number two CD of the year by dMute Magazine (Jazz and Improvised Music), France. Secret Sandhills and Satellites presents the best of Bolleter's work from 2001 to 2006.

Bolleter has performed with a variety of artists including Kavisha Mazzella, Tos Mahoney, Ryszard Ratajczak, Mark Cain, K.K.Null, Jim Denley, Jon Rose, David Moss, Simone de Haan, Michal Murin, Zdenek Plachy, Milan Adanciak, Stephen Scott, David Kotlowy, and Richard Lynn – as well as with bands such as the Black Eyed Susans. From 2000 to 2016, he has worked with producer/composer Anthony Cormican in a collaboration uniting Anthony's work with the music editing program Pro Tools with his own ultra-low tech ruined pianos. Since 2010, Bolleter has collaborated with the visual artist and composer Antoinette Carrier in work which includes her woven pianos as well as her creation of the first urban Piano Sanctuary in Bedford, Western Australia. Carrier's CD Nothing as a Thing was released on the WARPS label.

Bolleter performed as an accordionist/story teller at the Adelaide Festival of 1998, and on ruined piano(s) at the Australian National Academy of Music (ANAM) in "Piano!" (2009), in the Ten Days on the Island Festival, where he created the project "Ruined" (2008) and in various of Tura New Music's Totally Huge New Music Festivals under the artistic direction of Tos Mahoney, beginning with the Ruined Piano Convergence of 2005. Bolleter's work is regularly featured on ABC's Radio National and ABC FM.

Film maker Robert Castiglione has made a film of Bolleter's work with ruined pianos entitled Invitation to Ruin. It was shown in Tura's Totally Huge New Music Festival of 2015. Andrew Ford, in his book In Defence of Classical Music<ABC Books><Sydney, 2005> has a chapter on Bolleter's work entitled Things fall apart in the music of Ross Bolleter.

Zen Teacher
Ross Bolleter is an Australian Zen Buddhist teacher in the Diamond Sangha lineage. He trained with Robert Aitken and John Tarrant from 1982 to 1992. In 1992 he was authorized to teach by John Tarrant, and received transmission from Robert Aitken and John Tarrant in 1997. He teaches primarily in the Zen Group of Western Australia, but has also taught extensively elsewhere in Australia, and in New Zealand. His successors are: Mary Jaksch, Susan Murphy, Bob Joyner, Ian Sweetman, Glenn Wallis, Arthur Wells and Mari Rhydwen.

Bolleter's book The Five Ranks of Dongshan: Keys to Enlightenment was published by Wisdom Publications in 2014. His second book: "The Crow Flies Backwards and Other New Zen Koans" was published by Wisdom Publications in 2018. The koans in the Crow have as their themes: love, relationships, childbirth, work, and creativity, amongst others. For a selection of Bolleter's talks and reviews of his Five Ranks book see http://bolleterzen.com See also http://www.zgwa.org.au for information on the Zen Group of Western Australia, and other Bolleter podcasts.

References:
<Ross Bolleter: The Five Ranks of Dongshan: Keys to Enlightenment (Wisdom Publications, Massachusetts, 2014)>

<Ross Bolleter: The Crow Flies Backwards and Other New Zen Koans (Wisdom Publications, Massachusetts, 2018)>

Poetry
Fremantle Press published a volume of Bolleter's poems, Piano Hill in 2009. His earlier book of poems All the Iron Night was published by Smokebush Press in 2004. A book of one hundred prose poems entitled Blind Summits by Christopher Konrad and Ross Bolleter was published by Sunline Press in 2020. Bolleter's book Average Human Heart, which includes one hundred "left hand" stories as well as prose poems, was published by Editions Lenka Lente in 2022.  His volume of poems, Track me Down (Retrouve me trace) is due for publication in a bilingual edition (English and French) by Editions Lenka Lente in April 2023.

Discography
International Releases
Crow Country, Pogus, New York, P21021-2,2000
Secret Sandhills and satellites, Emanem 4128 (London), 2006
Night Kitchen, Emanem 5008, London, 2010
Ross Bolleter’s Total Piano, volumes 1-4 was released by Vincent Capes's Thödol Music, France, in July 2021.It features a booklet of Antoinette Carrier's subtle and lovely photographs of ruined pianos.
Ross Bolleter & Sylvain Roux (2021) Closer than Breathing: a synchronous creation WARPS W30
Ross Bolleter & Antoinette Carrier (2021) Compound Fracture: a synchronous creation WARPS W31
Closer than Breathing and Compound Fracture are due for release as  a double album on Vincent Capes's Thödol Music, France, in April 2023.

1990s
Country of Here Below, Tall Poppies TP045, Sydney, 1993

W08Ross Bolleter & Rob Muir: The Night Moves on Little Feet (1997) WARPS W03

Left Hand of the Universe (1997) WARPS W02

2000s
Crow Country, Pogus, New York, P21021-2,2000

Satellites (2002) WARPS W06

Secret Sandhills (2002) WARPS W05

Ross Bolleter: Paradise Café (2004) Sunset Ostrich S01

Pocket Sky (2004, 1991) WARPS

Secret Sandhills and satellites, Emanem 4128 (London), 2006

Ross Bolleter: Café Sophia (2008) Sunset Ostrich S02

Five by Five (2009) WARPS W11 DVD of 5 pieces in 5.1 Surround.

Intimate Ruins (2009) WARPS W10

2010s
Night Kitchen, Emanem 5008, London, 2010

Gust (2011) WARPS W15

Piano Dreaming (2nd edition) (2011) WARPS W12

Ross Bolleter & Anthony Cormican Spring in Iraq (2nd edition) (2011) WARPS W13

Solitary Light (2011) WARPS W14

Music of Chance WARPS W16 (2011, 2013)

Ross Bolleter & Anthony Cormican Concertino Latino (2012)–including Concertino Latino by Anthony Cormican & Ross Bolleter, 
performed by Anthony and Ross & Alone Together by Ross Bolleter, performed by Tos Mahoney & Ross Bolleter. Sunset Ostrich SO3

Ross Bolleter and David Kotlowy Vault (2012) (a WARPS Myo On co-production)

High Rise Piano (2013) WARPS W19

Ross Bolleter and Anthony Cormican Songs from the Third Watch: a song cycle (2013) WARPS W18

Frontier Piano (2014) WARPS W20

Music of Chance (2nd edition) (2014) WARPS W 21

While my coffee cools (2015) WARPS W22 – Bolleter's poems in a musical setting

Ross Bolleter & Anthony Cormican Quarry Music (2017) WARPS W23 – ruined pianos & stories in 5.1 surround, and stereo

Ross Bolleter & Martin Seddon Inland Sea (2017) WARPS W25 – two solo improvisations on two or more ruined pianos, including stories

Ross Bolleter & Anthony Cormican (2019) Beloved on this Earth: a song cycle WARPS W28 

Ross Bolleter & Anthony Cormican (2019) Café Antoinette 

Ross Bolleter & Anthony Cormican (2022) Beloved on this Earth (2nd edition): a song cycle WARPS W29

---TOTAL PIANO PROJECT---
Night is a world lit by itself (2017) WARPS W26 –solo improvisations for prepared piano. Total Piano, volume 1
Speak Love (2018) WARPS W27 – solo improvisations on ruined pianos and pianos at the edge of ruin. Total Piano, volume 2
Heard from Earth (2019) WARPS W28 - an angular approach to The Lounge Room Piano. Total Piano, volume 3
Terra Incognita (2020) WARPS W29 - three pieces for multiple ruined pianos in 360 surround. Total Piano, volume 4

2020s----
International release:
Total Piano, volumes 1-4 was released by Vincent Capes's Thödol Music, France, in July 2021.It features a booklet of Antoinette Carrier's subtle and lovely photographs of ruined pianos. 

Ross Bolleter & Sylvain Roux (2021) Closer than Breathing: a synchronous creation WARPS W30

Ross Bolleter & Antoinette Carrier (2021) Compound Fracture: a synchronous creation WARPS W31
  
Closer than Breathing and Compound Fracture are due for release on a double album on Vincent Capes's Thödol Music, France, in April 2023.
Ross Bolleter's book of left hand stories Average Human Heart published by Editions Lenka Lente Press, France, in October 2022.
Ross Bolleter's volume of poems Track Me Down/Retrouve ma trace is due for publication by Editions Lenka Lente in April 2023.

Compilations
Ross Bolleter's "Hymn to Ruin" on Margaret Leng Tan's She Herself Alone, Mode 221, New York.

Ross Bolleter's “Nallan Void” on Austral Voices New Albion NA028CD, San Francisco, (1990).

Books
- Average Human Heart: left hand stories (Editions Lenka Lente, 2022)
- The Crow Flies Backwards and Other New Zen Koans (Wisdom Publications, Massachusetts, 2018).

- 'Du piano-épave / The Well Weathered Piano'' (Editions Lenka Lente, 2017).

- The Five Ranks of Dongshan: Keys to Enlightenment (Wisdom Publications, Massachusetts, 2014).

- Piano Hill (Fremantle Press, 2008) Poems inspired by pianos, ruined and otherwise.

- All the Iron Night (Smokebush Press, 2004) Poems of love and death.

- Fostering Creative Improvisation at the Keyboard: A Handbook for Piano Teachers (1979)

References

</Andrew Ford, In Defense of Classical Music, ABC Books, Sydney, 2005>
See also </Tim Rutherford-Johnson, Music After the Fall, University of California Press, 2017
for further information on Bolleter's work.

External links
WARPS music , the label co-founded by Bolleter and Stephen Scott specializes in ruined piano music. WARPS: World association for Ruined Piano Studies.
An artistic history of Bolleter (outdated)

Australian male composers
Australian composers
1946 births
Living people
Musicians from Perth, Western Australia
Zen Buddhist spiritual teachers
Australian Zen Buddhists